The Cutler Majestic Theatre at Emerson College, in Boston, Massachusetts, is a 1903 Beaux Arts style theater, designed by the architect John Galen Howard. Originally built for theatre, it was one of three theaters commissioned in Boston by Eben Dyer Jordan, son of the founder of Jordan Marsh, a Boston-based chain of department stores. The Majestic was converted to accommodate vaudeville shows in the 1920s and eventually into a movie house in the 1950s. The change to film came with renovations that transformed the lobby and covered up much of John Galen Howard's original Beaux-Arts architecture.

The theater continued to show movies until 1983 as the Saxon Theatre. By then, the theater began to deteriorate both in appearance and in programming. On January 15, 1961, American Nazi Party founder George Lincoln Rockwell and a fellow Nazi Party member attempted to picket the local premiere of the film Exodus at the Saxon while staying at the Hotel Touraine directly across Tremont Street. After Boston Mayor John F. Collins (1960–1968) declined to deny Rockwell the right to picket, members of the local Jewish Defense League chapter organized a counterdemonstration of 2,000 Jewish protestors in response on the corner of Tremont and Boylston Streets on the day of the premiere, which forced police to converge on the theater and force Rockwell into a police cruiser that took him to Logan International Airport where Rockwell was then boarded onto a flight to Washington, DC.

In the mid-1980s Emerson College purchased the theater and restored it to its original Beaux-Arts appearance. The theater today is a performing arts center for both Emerson College and the community at large. It was the home base of Opera Boston. It is frequently staging shows by New England Conservatory, Teatro Lirico D'Europa, Celebrity Series of Boston, Emerson College's Emerson Stage company and the Boston Gay Men's Chorus. In 2003 the theater was again renamed the Cutler Majestic Theatre, after donors Ted and Joan Benard-Cutler.

It is listed on the National Register of Historic Places (as part of the Piano Row District), the Massachusetts Register of Historic Places, and was designated a Boston Landmark in 1986. The theatre is located at 219 Tremont Street in the Boston Theater District. It seats just under 1,200 people.

Footnotes

External links

The Cutler Majestic Theatre official website
 Library of Congress Photo of the Majestic, 1900s
 Flickr. Photo of the Saxon, 1984
 City of Boston, Landmarks Commission. Saxon Theatre Study Report, 1983

Theatres completed in 1903
1903 establishments in Massachusetts
Theatres in Boston
Emerson College
University and college theatres in the United States
Boston Theater District
John Galen Howard buildings
National Register of Historic Places in Boston
Theatres on the National Register of Historic Places in Massachusetts